The 1974 Los Angeles Rams season was the team's 37th year with the National Football League and the 29th season in Los Angeles. The Rams looked to improve on its 12-2 season from 1973 and win the NFC West for the 2nd straight season. While not improving on their record, they did win their division for the 2nd straight season with a 10-4 record, which was good enough for the 2nd best record in the NFC. In the playoffs, Los Angeles defeated the Washington Redskins in a rematch of week 13's game, which Washington won 23-17, which turned out to be the Rams only loss at home during the entire season. They won this game 19-10 to advance to the NFC Championship Game for the first time ever. However, they lost to the Minnesota Vikings 14-10 to end their season.

Offseason

NFL Draft

Roster

Regular season

Schedule

Playoffs

Standings

Awards and records
 Merlin Olsen, Bert Bell Award

References

Los Angeles Rams
Los Angeles Rams seasons
NFC West championship seasons
Los Angeles Rams